Hüseyin Atıcı (born 3 May 1986) is a Turkish track and field athlete competing in shot put.

He qualified for participation in shot put event at the 2012 Summer Olympics, but did not reach the final round. At the 2013 Islamic Solidarity Games held in Palembang, Indonesia, Atıcı won the bronze medal.

Competition record

References

External links
 
 

1986 births
Living people
People from Tirebolu
Turkish male shot putters
Fenerbahçe athletes
Olympic athletes of Turkey
Athletes (track and field) at the 2012 Summer Olympics
Competitors at the 2011 Summer Universiade
Competitors at the 2013 Summer Universiade
Athletes (track and field) at the 2013 Mediterranean Games
Mediterranean Games competitors for Turkey
Islamic Solidarity Games competitors for Turkey
20th-century Turkish people
21st-century Turkish people